Hohonus is a genus of hidden snout weevils in the beetle family Curculionidae. There are at least two described species in Hohonus.

Species
These two species belong to the genus Hohonus:
 Hohonus lacteicollis (Champion, 1906)
 Hohonus sturio Anderson, 1994

References

Further reading

 
 
 

Cryptorhynchinae
Articles created by Qbugbot